Crasnoe is a town in the Slobozia District of Transnistria, Moldova. It is under the administration of the breakaway government of the Pridnestrovian Moldavian Republic.

References

Cities and towns in Transnistria
Cities and towns in Moldova
Kherson Governorate
Slobozia District